Paul Dubov (October 10, 1918 – September 20, 1979) was an American radio, film and television actor as well as screenwriter. He frequently appeared in the works of Sam Fuller.

Among Dubov's radio credits include the 05/02/1953 episode of Gunsmoke entitled "Tacetta".  Dubov became a screenwriter and often worked with his wife, Gwen Bagni (1913–2001), whom he married in 1963. The couple co-developed the 1965–66 series Honey West, starring Anne Francis, and wrote scripts for the series from which it was a spin off, Burke's Law starring Gene Barry. Both series were on ABC-TV and produced by Four Star Television.
 
Another television role as an actor included Federal Agent and wiretap specialist Jack Rossman in the original pilot episode of ABC-TV's The Untouchables, starring Robert Stack, which was later released into theaters as The Scarface Mob. For the series his role was taken over by Steve London.
 
Dubnov's television appearances included roles on Perry Mason, That Girl starring Marlo Thomas, Hawaiian Eye, Stoney Burke starring Jack Lord, Gunsmoke starring James Arness, The Bill Dana Show, Arrest and Trial, Make Room for Daddy, Bat Masterson, 77 Sunset Strip, Bonanza, Surfside Six, The Cara Williams Show, and many more.

Partial filmography

 Little Tough Guy (1938) – Chuck (uncredited)
 Secrets of a Nurse (1938) – Newspaper Vendor (uncredited)
 Appointment for Love (1941) – Blake (uncredited)
 Bombay Clipper (1942) – News Photographer (uncredited)
 North to the Klondike (1942) – Piety Smith
 Girls' Town (1942) – Lionel Fontaine
 The Mystery of Marie Roget (1942) – Pierre, News Vendor (uncredited)
 Escape from Hong Kong (1942) – Franz Schuler
 Danger in the Pacific (1942) – Manola
 Who Done It? (1942) – Radio Actor (uncredited)
 The Boss of Big Town (1942) – Graham
 Mug Town (1942) – Waiter (uncredited)
 The Adventures of Smilin' Jack (1943, Serial) – Mandonese Man [Chs. 2–3] (uncredited)
 It Ain't Hay (1943) – Tout (uncredited)
 Don Winslow of the Coast Guard (1943, Serial) – Coast Guardsman [Ch. 3] (uncredited)
 Follow the Band (1943) – Alphonse (uncredited)
 We've Never Been Licked (1943) – Student (uncredited)
 Strange Holiday (1945) – Second Detective
 The Set-Up (1949) – Gambler (uncredited)
 Champion (1949) – Gangster (uncredited)
 Outside the Wall (1950) – Stick-Up Man (uncredited)
 Young Man with a Horn (1950) – Maxie (uncredited)
 Perfect Strangers (1950) – Vonderheit (uncredited)
 Triple Trouble (1950) – Pretty Boy Gleason
 The Killer That Stalked New York (1950) – Intern, Phil (uncredited)
 Cyrano de Bergerac (1950) – Cadet
 The Flying Missile (1950) – Army Lieutenant (uncredited)
 Missing Women (1951) – Mechanic (uncredited)
 Her First Romance (1951) – Camp Counsellor (uncredited)
 The Mob (1951) – Johnson – Mobile Unit #3 Man (uncredited)
 Sunny Side of the Street (1951) – Miller – Studio Page (uncredited)
 The Family Secret (1951) – Deputy District Attorney (uncredited)
 Red Skies of Montana (1952) – Doctor (uncredited)
 The Sniper (1952) – Barfly (uncredited)
 Deadline – U.S.A. (1952) – Mac, Photographer (uncredited)
 High Noon (1952) – Scott (uncredited)
 Kansas City Confidential (1952) – Eddie (uncredited)
 I, the Jury (1953) – Marty
 The Glass Web (1953) – Man (uncredited)
 The Long Wait (1954) – Chuck (uncredited)
 The Last Time I Saw Paris (1954) – Helen's Escort (uncredited)
 The Atomic Kid (1954) – Anderson (uncredited)
 The Silver Chalice (1954) – Jabez – Roman Magistrate (uncredited)
 Six Bridges to Cross (1955) – Bandit Leader (uncredited)
 Abbott and Costello Meet the Keystone Kops (1955) – Jason – Plane Pilot (uncredited)
 Cell 2455, Death Row (1955) – Al
 Mad at the World (1955) – Jamie Allison
 Jump Into Hell (1955) – Medic (uncredited)
 Apache Woman (1955) – Ben Hunter
 Day the World Ended (1955) – Radek
 That Certain Feeling (1956) – Hal Kern, TV Director (uncredited)
 The She Creature (1956) – Johnny
 He Laughed Last (1956) – Billy Boy Barnes (uncredited)
 Shake, Rattle and Rock (1956) – Bugsy Smith
 Guns Don't Argue (1957) – Alvin Karpis (archive footage)
 Voodoo Woman (1957) – Marcel Chateau
 China Gate (1957) – Capt. Caumont
 The Brothers Rico (1957) – Phil
 Forty Guns (1957) – Judge Macy
 Tokyo After Dark (1959) – Jesse Bronson
 Verboten! (1959) – Capt. R. Harvey
 The Crimson Kimono (1959) – Casale
 The Atomic Submarine (1959) – Lt. David Milburn
 The Purple Gang (1959) – Thomas Allen aka Killer Burke
  Wanted Dead or Alive (1960) 
 Underworld U.S.A. (1961) – Gela
 Bat Masterson (1961) – Tom Fulton
 The Comancheros (1961)
 The Underwater City (1962) – George Burnett
 Irma la Douce (1963) – Andre
 Shock Corridor (1963) – Dr. J.L. Menkin
 Crash! (1977) – Dr. Cross (final film role)

References

External links

1918 births
1979 deaths
American male film actors
20th-century American male actors